Wyoming Highway 10 (WYO 10) is a  Wyoming state highway known as Jelm Mountain Road in southwestern Albany County.

Route description
WYO 10 is a north–south route that runs from Wyoming Highway 230 in Woods Landing south to the Wyoming-Colorado State Line and continues into Colorado as Larimer County Route 103. WYO 230 serves the Jelm Mountain Observatory (at an elevation 9656 feet). Mileposts along WYO 10 increase from north to south (0.00 to 9.12).
Wyoming Highway 10 is the lowest numbered state route in Wyoming.

Major intersections

References

External links

 Wyoming State Routes 000–099
 WYO 10 – WYO 230 to Colorado State Line

Transportation in Carbon County, Wyoming
Transportation in Albany County, Wyoming
010